Protein transport protein Sec24C is a protein that in humans is encoded by the SEC24C gene.

Function 

The protein encoded by this gene is a member of the SEC24 subfamily of the SEC23/SEC24 family, which is involved in vesicle trafficking. The encoded protein has similarity to yeast Sec24p component of COPII. COPII is the coat protein complex responsible for vesicle budding from the ER. The product of this gene may play a role in shaping the vesicle, as well as in cargo selection and concentration. Alternatively spliced transcript variants encoding the same protein have been identified.

Interactions 

SEC24C has been shown to interact with SEC23A.

References

Further reading